Dan Sefton is a British screenwriter, best known for the dramas Trust Me and The Good Karma Hospital. Prior to screenwriting, he worked as a doctor.

Early life
Sefton's mother was a doctor, while his father was a civil servant. He qualified as a doctor in 1995. Early in his medical career, he worked in South Africa, which would later help inspire Good Karma.

Television 
Early work included all four of the BBC's popular continuing dramas, Doctors, EastEnders, Casualty and its spinoff, Holby City. In 2017, Sefton created the medical drama The Good Karma Hospital for ITV and Tiger Aspect Productions. The series is shot in Unawatuna in southern Sri Lanka, Thiranagama Golden Beach Restaurant and some other places in Galle District. It was recommissioned for a second series. Filming for the second series started in August 2017 and was broadcast from 18 March 2018. Season 3 has been confirmed and will return in 2019.

In 2016, he created Delicious, starring Dawn French, and in 2017 Trust Me, starring Jodie Whittaker. Due to Jodie Whittaker's casting as the Thirteenth Doctor in Doctor Who, the second series was set on the neurological unit of South Lothian Hospital, following Syrian tour veteran Captain James 'Jamie' McKay. In 2019, BBC One broadcast his crime series, The Mallorca Files.

During the COVID-19 pandemic, which impacted the filming of the second series of The Mallorca Files, Sefton returned to medical work. On January 11, 2022, it was announced Sefton would be developing a drama series about the life of ex-Genesis drummer Chris Stewart.

Writing credits

References

External links
 

Living people
British television writers
English television writers
English screenwriters
English male screenwriters
British male television writers
Year of birth missing (living people)
21st-century British screenwriters
21st-century English male writers